The Sacramento County Board of Supervisors  is the five member governing board of Sacramento County, California.

Like all other counties in California, with the exception of the City and County of San Francisco, Sacramento is split into five districts and each district elects a supervisor every four years.

Board of Supervisors

Current members

Prior members
Don Nottoli
Roger Dickinson
Grantland Johnson  
Roberta MacGlashan
Susan Peters
Jimmie R. Yee
Fred Wade

See also
County Board of Supervisors

References

External links
Sacramento County Board of Supervisors Website

County government in California
Board of Supervisors